Boissy-Saint-Léger is a railway station in Boissy-Saint-Léger, an eastern suburb of Paris, France. It is one of the terminuses of the RER A trains.

Transport

Train 
Since 10 December 2017, the station is served (both departure and arrival) by:
 on off-peak hours: a train every 8 to 12 minutes (from Monday to Friday) or every 10 minutes (on weekends and public holidays);
 on peak hours: a train every 4 to 7 minutes (that is to say about ten trains per hour) during school term or a train every 6 minutes in summer and during the school holidays;
 in the evening, all year round: a train every 15 minutes.

Bus connections 
The station is served by several buses.
 Situs Bus network lines: 5 and 6;
 Setra Bus network lines: 12, 21 and 23;
 Strav Bus network lines: J1 and J2;
  Noctilien network night bus line: .

References

Réseau Express Régional stations
Railway stations in France opened in 1874
Railway stations in Val-de-Marne